This is a non-exhaustive list of Cyprus women's international footballers – association football players who have appeared at least once for the senior Cyprus women's national football team.

Players

See also 
 Cyprus women's national football team

References

 
Cyprus
Association football player non-biographical articles